Khimzavod is a rural locality (a settlement) in Susolovskoye Rural Settlement, Velikoustyugsky District, Vologda Oblast, Russia. The population was 30 as of 2002.

Geography 
Khimzavod is located 66 km east of Veliky Ustyug (the district's administrative centre) by road. Severny is the nearest rural locality.

References 

Rural localities in Velikoustyugsky District